Nicolò Cavuoti (born 4 April 2003) is an Italian professional footballer who plays as a winger for  club Cagliari.

Career
A youth product of Virtus Vasto since 2012, Cavuoti moved to Vastese in 2019. He began his senior career with Vastese in the Serie D in 2019, before joining the U17s of Cagliari in 2020, and getting promoted to their reserves. He made his professional debut with Cagliari in a 1–0 Coppa Italia loss to Sassuolo on 19 January 2022, coming on as a late sub in the 87th minute.

International career
Cavuoti is a youth international for Italy, having represented the Italy U18s and U19s.

References

External links
 
 
 Lega Serie A Profile
 FIGC U18 Profile
 FIGC U19 Profile

2003 births
Living people
People from Vasto
Italian footballers
Italy youth international footballers
Cagliari Calcio players
Serie D players
Association football midfielders
Sportspeople from the Province of Chieti
Footballers from Abruzzo